Larry English (born January 22, 1986) is a former American football player. He played college football as a defensive end at Northern Illinois and was drafted by the San Diego Chargers as an outside linebacker in the first round of the 2009 NFL Draft. He also played for the Tampa Bay Buccaneers.

High school career
At Marmion Academy, in Aurora, Illinois, English was named team co-captain, MVP, and First-team All-Suburban Catholic Conference both as a junior and senior. He made 98 tackles and six sacks while playing inside linebacker and as a running back he rushed for 312 yards on 38 carries (8.2 avg).  As a junior, he had 100 tackles, and added two interceptions and two fumble recoveries during junior campaign. English lettered in football, basketball and track.

College career
English was a medical redshirt in 2004 after playing in the first game of the season and sustaining an injury. The following season, 2005, he played 11 games, starting nine. He had 78 tackles with seven of them being for a loss.  The next season, 2006, he was a First-team All-MAC selection. Started all 13 games and tied school record with 12 sacks, while totaling 51 tackles and forcing four fumbles.

In 2007, English was the Mid-American Conference's  MVP and was a consensus choice First-team All-MAC and a Fourth-team All-American by Phil Steele as he recorded 17 tackles for loss–which ranked 18th in the NCAA. Also in 2007 English had 10.5 sacks which led the conference. English also deflected two passes. As a senior (2008 Season) English again won the Vern Smith Award, given to the MAC's top player. Additionally, English was named the MAC Defensive Player of the Year by the MAC News Media Association  as well as Sporting News. He led the Huskies with eight sacks and 14.5 tackles for loss and he was an All-MAC choice for the third consecutive season.

Career statistics

Key: GP - games played; GS - games started; UA - unassisted tackles; AT - assisted tackles; TT - total tackles; T/L - tackles for a loss; Sacks - ; FF – Forced fumble ; FR – Fumbles recovered; PD - passes deflected; Int - interceptions

Professional career

Larry English scored a 34 on the aptitude assessment Wonderlic Test at the 2009 NFL Draft Combine, one of the highest scores ever recorded for his position, outside linebacker, and the 9th highest score of the 2009 NFL Draft Class. With comparison to IQ, a Wonderlic Score of 34 suggests English has an IQ of 128, twenty-eight points above average. Picked 16th overall in the 2009 NFL Draft, English is the highest drafted player out of Northern Illinois.

San Diego Chargers
English was drafted by the Chargers first round, 16th overall, in the 2009 NFL Draft. English was a defensive end in college, however, the Chargers indicated he will be an outside linebacker in the NFL."The more I learned about the 3-4 scheme and my abilities, the type of football player I am ... I think I will fit perfectly in it," said English.  English had 23 tackles as a rookie, but suffered a foot fracture in the 2010 training camp and started just four games in total going into the 2013 season for the Chargers.  English has since continued to struggle with injuries and poor play, missing 21 games and accumulating just 6 combined sacks between 2011 and 2013. He was released by the Chargers on July 22, 2014.

Tampa Bay Buccaneers
English was signed by the Tampa Bay Buccaneers on August 14, 2014, He was cut by the team on August 29 and later re-signed again on September 9, 2014.

NFL statistics

Personal life
English served as the honorary chairman of the American Lung Association inaugural Fight For Air Climb in San Diego on February 27, 2011. English, who has struggled with asthma since he was a child, stated: “As an individual living with asthma, I truly understand the challenges this disease presents.”

On May 19, 2017, English married model Nicole Williams, with whom he appeared on WAGS, a reality series about the romantic partners of athletes.The couple announced that they were expecting their first child together in July 2022, on the models personal Instagram.

English plays a cameo role in the 2017 video game Madden NFL 18 "Longshot" story mode.

References

External links
San Diego Chargers bio

1986 births
Living people
Sportspeople from Aurora, Illinois
Players of American football from Illinois
American football linebackers
American football defensive ends
Northern Illinois Huskies football players
San Diego Chargers players
Tampa Bay Buccaneers players